Brooke Pinto (born ) is an American attorney and politician. In June 2020, she won the special election to succeed Jack Evans on the Council of the District of Columbia, representing Ward 2. She is the youngest Councilmember in the District's history and the first woman to represent Ward 2.

Early life and education
Born in Greenwich, Connecticut, Pinto is the daughter of James Pinto, a private equity investor who heads MVC Capital. She attended Cornell University and completed a degree in business and hospitality administration. She then moved to Washington, D.C. to attend Georgetown University Law School, where she earned a Juris Doctor in 2017. While at Georgetown Law School, Pinto worked with the Washington Legal Clinic for the Homeless and Georgetown University Medical School, where she helped to address the intersectionality of health and legal issues.

Career
After graduating from law school, Pinto worked for Attorney General for the District of Columbia Karl Racine through a one-year fellowship, after which he hired her as assistant attorney general for policy and legislative affairs. She helped craft legislation to address hate crimes and deceptive charity practices. She left the role after one year to launch her campaign for Council of the District of Columbia.

2020 campaign for the D.C. Council

June 2020 Primary Election

In February 2020, Pinto announced her candidacy for Ward 2 Councilmember after incumbent Jack Evans resigned amidst an ethics scandal. Evans resigned before his colleagues could expel him, which nearly certainly would have otherwise happened. As with other candidates, Pinto ran in the primary election for the Democratic nomination and the special election to fill the remainder of Evans' term. 

Pinto was the last entrant into a crowded field that included Evans (who filed to run in both the primary and special elections just ten days after he resigned following multiple ethics violations). Pinto touted that she was the only candidate with business, tax, and legislative experience, which was needed in the wake of the COVID-19 pandemic. Karl Racine endorsed her campaign.

In early polls, Pinto trailed behind opponents with only two to three percent of the vote. However, after the Washington Post editorial board endorsed Pinto, claiming that she would provide a "needed new start," she began to gain momentum. 

Pinto garnered support from Congressmen Richard Blumenthal, for whom she had previously worked, and Joe Kennedy III, who previously received $7,500 and $12,800 in donations, respectively, from her father James Pinto.  

Pinto pulled off a surprise victory, earning 28 percent of the vote in a field of eight candidates listed on the ballot and ultimately winning the Democratic primary by about 300 votes.

Following her June 2020 primary election victory, Washington City Paper reported that Pinto had never previously voted in a DC election. Among Ward 2 candidates, she had the lowest share of D.C. contributors and the most money from out of state donors. Pinto was the only candidate who did not participate in D.C.'s Fair Elections public financing program, which allowed her to self-fund $45,000 for her campaign.

June 2020 Special Election

In the June 16 special election to finish the remaining term on the vacant Ward 2 Council seat, Pinto won with 43 percent of the vote in a field of seven candidates.

November 2020 General Election

Pinto faced multiple challengers in the general election, focusing their campaigns on her finances and local expertise. Opponents included Peter Bolton, the D.C. Statehood Green Party candidate, and independents Martín Miguel Fernández and Randy Downs.

In 2021, Pinto was accused of breaking campaign finance laws in an effort to retire her campaign debts. At a $500 a head fundraiser hosted by a Ward 2 developer, Pinto raised $21,000, in violation of a DC law that prohibits candidates from fundraising to pay off campaign debts more than six months after they are elected. Pinto said that in meetings with the Office of Campaign Finance (OCF), she specifically asked if such a fundraiser would be permittable and that OCF officials did not raise any objections. OCF disputed this characterization.

Councilmember (2020-present)
In office, Pinto has established herself as a swing vote between the more progressive and the more moderate blocs. In her first term in office, Pinto introduced and passed legislation to streamline business licensing processes to support new and existing small and local businesses, expand access to menstrual health products, and increase access to public restrooms. 

On December 21, 2022, Pinto was announced to be the new Chairwoman of the Committee on the Judiciary and Public Safety, an influential position especially given the rise in crime in the city.

Electoral history

References

1990s births
21st-century American politicians
21st-century American women politicians
Cornell University alumni
Living people
Members of the Council of the District of Columbia
People from Greenwich, Connecticut
Washington, D.C., Democrats
Washington, D.C., government officials
Women city councillors in the District of Columbia